Patriarch Metrophanes may refer to:

Patriarch Metrophanes II of Constantinople, reigned from 1440 to 1443
Patriarch Metrophanes III of Constantinople, reigned from 1565 to 1572 and from 1579 to 1580
Patriarch Metrophanes of Alexandria (Mêtrophanês Kritopoulos), reigned between 1636 and 1639